Angraecum conchiferum is a species of orchid found in Knysna and Tsitsikamma forests.

This rather rare and attractive species has the distinction of having the largest flowers of the South African monopodial epiphytic orchids. It normally forms untidy clumps of long, thin, pendulous sterns which carry small dark-green, linear leaves spaced along the stems in two ranks. The solitary white flower have a distinct shell-like lip and a long spur. Flowers appear from September to November.

The white roots  in diameter are covered with small wart-like glands.

Occurs in deep shade in cool moist temperate forests usually as a high-level epiphyte on large trees though sometimes it occurs on small trees near the fringe of forests.

The name "conchiferum" is derived from Latin meaning "shell-bearing" which refers to the lip.

conchiferum